Woody Wilson may refer to:

Woody Wilson (writer), writer of the comic strips Judge Parker and Rex Morgan, M.D. since 1990
Woody Wilson, former bass guitar player for the band Alive N Kickin'
Woodie Wilson (1925–1994), racing driver

See also
Woodrow Wilson (disambiguation)